Sinner Take All is a 1936 murder mystery film directed by Errol Taggart and starring Bruce Cabot and Margaret Lindsay.

Plot
When millionaire New York City businessman Aaron Lampier (Charley Grapewin) receives a death threat in the mail, he sends for his offspring. Ernie Hyams (Bruce Cabot), a newspaper reporter turned lawyer, is dispatched by MacKelvey (Stanley Ridges), his former editor, to track down Lampier's daughter Lorraine (Margaret Lindsay). She does not appreciate being dragged away from the nightclub/casino of Frank Penny (Joseph Calleia). She and her perpetually drunk brother Stephen (George Lynn) have also received similar mail. When their brother David is killed in a car crash that night, Ernie soon discovers it was not an accident; a wire cable strung across the road was used to cause it. Ernie is pressured into investigating.

Lampier's will leaves everything equally to his children. If they predecease him, the estate goes to various charities.

Stephen is the next victim. An associate of Penny's is driving Stephen's car when he is stopped by the police. They find Stephen's body inside with six shots to the head; the driver claims he did not know it was there when he stole the automobile. Captain Bill Royce (Edward Pawley) of the Homicide Squad arrests Penny, but has to release him for lack of evidence. It turns out that David is still alive and in hiding. By the time Ernie and MacKelvey track him down, though, he has been stabbed to death.

Next is Aaron Lampier. A man climbs down to his suite and, after a struggle, flings him over the terrace to his death.

To protect Lorraine (to whom he has become attracted), Ernie sets a trap. He spreads the word that she is flying away at midnight, then gathers all the prime suspects at Penny's nightclub to see her off. Her drink is poisoned, but a doctor is standing by and she is saved. Ernie sadly identifies the killer; MacKelvey was the only one who had the opportunity to slip poison into the liquor. The editor confesses that he needed more money to keep his wife Alicia (Vivienne Osborne) happy. He figured that with the Lampiers all dead, he would be put in charge of one of their businesses. Afterward, Ernie and Lorraine get married.

Cast
 Bruce Cabot as Ernie
 Margaret Lindsay as Lorraine
 Joseph Calleia as Penny
 Stanley Ridges as MacKelvey
 Vivienne Osborne as Alicia
 Charley Grapewin as Aaron
 Edward Pawley as Royce
 George Lynn as Stephen
 Theodore von Eltz as David (as Theodore Von Eltz)
 Eadie Adams as Shirley
 George Zucco as Bascomb
 Dorothy Kilgallen as Reporter
 Raymond Hatton as Hotel Clerk
 Richard Terry as Pete

References

External links
 
 
 
 

American mystery films
American black-and-white films
Films based on American novels
Films set in New York City
Metro-Goldwyn-Mayer films
Films directed by Errol Taggart
1936 films
1936 mystery films
Films scored by Edward Ward (composer)
1930s American films